Mat Lucas (born October 27, 1977) is an American voice actor, who is most notable for voicing the Star Wars character Anakin Skywalker in the series Star Wars: Clone Wars and various video games. He has also worked as an editor and in the editorial department on several projects.

Career

Star Wars
The similarity of Lucas's voice with that of Hayden Christensen was highlighted from his work on Star Wars: The Clone Wars, with a Video Game Talk review of the game saying that his voice-acting "could almost pass for Hayden Christensen", while saying that overall the voice work on the game was generally good.

Filmography

Film

Television

Video games

References

External links
 
 
 

1977 births
Living people
American male voice actors
Male actors from New York City